The Rafi Ahmed Kidwai Award was created in 1956 by the Indian Council of Agricultural Research (ICAR) in 1956 to recognize Indian researchers in the agricultural field. The award is named after Indian Independence activist Rafi Ahmed Kidwai. Awards are distributed biennially, and takes the form of medals, citations, and cash prizes.

Awardee List
Following is list of the recipients of the Rafi Ahmed Kidwai Award:
 Hiralal Chaudhuri

Controversies 
There have been several complaints that Dr K.C. Bansal falsified the patent information on the basis of which Kidwai Award (2007-2008) was given to him. The Award was given to Dr Bansal for patenting a technique to transfer foreign gene to brinjal chloroplast. It was found that Dr Bansal did not have such a patent to his credit and that he filed an application for patent only after the award was given. The matter got wide publicity in press, media and scientific journals. Several scientists demanded Shri Sharad Pawar, Former Minister for Agriculture to remove Dr Bansal from the post of Director, NBPGR. Questions were raised in Indian Parliament. Mr Tariq Anwer, Minister of State for Agriculture has answered that an enquiry has been initiated to look into the issues. However, reports suggest that ICAR has hushed up the matter and RTI queries for the outcome of the enquiry were not answered.

See also

 List of agriculture awards

References

Indian awards
Indian Council of Agricultural Research
Awards established in 1956
Agriculture awards of India
Lists of Indian award winners
1956 establishments in India